İpek is a common feminine Turkish given name. In Turkish, "İpek" means "Silk".

People
 İpek Çalışlar, a writer
 İpek Derici (born 1990), a basketball player
 İpek Emiroğlu (born 1992), Turkish female football referee
 İpek Filiz Yazıcı (born 2001), Turkish actress
 İpek Kaya (born 1994), Turkish-French women's footballer
 İpek Özkök (born 1982), Turkish actress and model
 İpek Soroğlu (born 1985), Turkish volleyball player
 İpek Soylu (born 1996), Turkish tennis player
 İpek Şenoğlu (born 1979), a tennis player
 İpek Yaylacıoğlu (born 1984), Turkish actress

Fictional characters
 Ipek Hanım Yildiz, a fictional character in Orhan Pamuk's novel Snow

Turkish feminine given names